Ward–Belmont College was a women's college, also known at the time as a "ladies' seminary," located in Nashville, Tennessee, on the grounds of the antebellum estate of  Adelicia Hayes Franklin Acklen Cheatham.

The school used the grounds of the former Acklen estate and mansion, with a quadrangle of academic and residential buildings being erected over time on the front lawn.  It was regarded as a very prestigious "finishing school" by the more aristocratic families of Middle Tennessee, although some students were from considerably farther away.

History

In 1865, William E. Ward and his wife, Eliza Hudson Ward, opened Ward Seminary for Young Ladies in Nashville, Tennessee, to offer "a full and thorough course of instruction, embracing academic and collegiate work."

In 1870, the Educational Bureau in Washington, DC, ranked Ward Seminary among the top three educational institutions for women in the nation. The school also placed emphasis on athletics, organizing the first girls' varsity basketball team in the South and one of the first in the nation.

Belmont College for Young Women, founded by Susan L. Heron and Ida E. Hood, opened on September 4, 1890.  Modeled on the women’s colleges of the Northeast, the school was established on a  site centered on Belmont, the home of Adelicia Hayes Franklin Acklen Cheatham, which was built in 1850.

Ward Seminary and Belmont College for Young Women merged in 1913 to form Ward-Belmont, the first junior college in the South to receive full accreditation by the Southern Association of Colleges and Secondary Schools. Dr. John Diell Blanton was the first president of  Ward- Belmont, he was previously the president of Ward Seminary since 1883. In 1914 an academic building was dedicated to Dr. Blanton, however it burned down in 1972.  By the 1920s, it had an enrollment of more than 1,200 women. The Preparatory School was a four year secondary high school program. Entrance to the College and Conservatory of Music was for students who had completed high school. The College and Conservatory of Music were two-year junior college programs that prepared students for senior universities. To accommodate the large number of students, three new dormitory buildings were built: Pembroke (1913), Heron (1916), and Hail (1923). These dormitories are still in use at Belmont University.

In 1951, under financial constraints, Ward-Belmont's campus was sold to the Tennessee Baptist Convention. The campus was used to establish Belmont College (now Belmont University).  A new, modern, nonresidential girls' high school, Harpeth Hall School, was established on the Estes estate in the affluent Green Hills section of Nashville to take the place of Ward-Belmont.

The original campus remained under the aegis of the Tennessee Baptist Convention until 2007, when Belmont University became independent of its control.

Social activities 
Club Village was a collection of ten houses that were made for Ward-Belmont's social clubs. The social clubs included Anti-Pandora, Twentieth Century, Del Vers, Tri K, Penta Tau, X. L., Osiron, Agora, A.K., and F.F. Each of the houses included a formal club room, kitchen, game room, and music room. At the start of the academic year, students would engage in a "rushing" period in which they would familiarize themselves with the different clubs. Every student who participated in this period was accepted into one of the clubs.

May Day Festival was one of the outstanding social events of the spring. This marks the culmination of the Physical Education Program, in which every student participates. The grand parade, picturesque costumes of the dancers and the May Queen with her Court add a dramatic touch to the celebration which is viewed by several thousand friends, parents, and alumnae.

Notable alumnae
 Birdie Alexander, musician and educator
 Carman Barnes, writer
 Elizabeth Lee Bloomstein, history professor and clubwoman
 Nancy Cox-McCormack, sculptor
 Jean Faircloth, philanthropist
 Cornelia Fort, aviator
 Elizabeth P. Farrington, publisher of the Honolulu Star-Bulletin and Congressional Delegate
 Iris Kelso, newspaper journalist and television news correspondent
 Clare Boothe Luce, editor and playwright
 Mary Martin, actress
Olive Stokes Mix, actress
 Grace Moore, singer
 Minnie Pearl (Sarah Colley Cannon), country music comedian
 Lila Acheson Wallace, co-founder of Reader's Digest
 Alice Wilson McElroy, niece of U.S. President Woodrow Wilson

See also
 List of current and historical women's universities and colleges in the United States

References

External links
Harpeth Hall School and Ward-Belmont in the Tennessee Encyclopedia of History and Culture
Belmont University: Ward-Belmont Reunion

Defunct private universities and colleges in Tennessee
Two-year colleges in the United States
Universities and colleges in Nashville, Tennessee
Embedded educational institutions
Educational institutions established in 1865
Former women's universities and colleges in the United States
1865 establishments in Tennessee